The Australian Universities Rugby League is the body responsible for the development and growth of Rugby League throughout the tertiary level of education within Australia.

It selects the Australian team to compete in University World Cups.

Its members are the New South Wales Tertiary Student Rugby League and the Universities Rugby League Queensland who run the state competitions in their respective states.

New South Wales Tertiary Students Rugby League

The TSRL runs a nine team competition between New South Wales and Canberra Universities.

Universities Rugby League Queensland

The URLQ runs a six team competition featuring the following universities.

See also

References

External links
AURL
NSWTRL
URLQ

Queensland Rugby League
Rugby league governing bodies in Australia
Sport at Australian universities
University and college rugby league